Tharaasu is a 1984 Indian Tamil-language film, directed by Rajaganapathy and produced by G. Kanakasubbu. The film stars Sivaji Ganesan, K. R. Vijaya, Poornam Viswanathan and Prabhu. It was released on 16 March 1984. The film was a box office failure.

Plot

Cast 
Sivaji Ganesan
K. R. Vijaya
Poornam Viswanathan
Prabhu
Ambika
M. N. Nambiar
Ganthimathi
Y. G. Mahendra
V. K. Ramasamy
S. Varalakshmi
Silk Smitha as item number

Soundtrack 
The music was composed by M. S. Viswanathan and lyrics were written by Puratchi Daasan.

Reception 

Kalki wrote .

References

External links 
 

1980s Tamil-language films
1984 films
Films scored by M. S. Viswanathan